P2 is a 2007 American horror thriller film directed by Franck Khalfoun, in his directorial debut, co-written by Khalfoun and producers Alexandre Aja and Grégory Levasseur, and starring Rachel Nichols and Wes Bentley. Its plot follows a young businesswoman who becomes trapped in an underground parking garage in midtown Manhattan on Christmas Eve, where she is pursued by a psychopathic security guard who is obsessed with her.

Following the release of their film High Tension (2003), Aja and his co-writer on that film, Levasseur, developed the screenplay for P2 alongside Khalfoun, inspired by a series of real-life attacks on women that were reported in Paris parking garages. Filming began in late-2006 in Toronto, with the majority of the shoot taking place in a real, operating parking garage.

P2 was released theatrically in the United States in November 2007, and was the first feature film distributed by Summit Entertainment. It was a box-office flop, averaging less than $1,000 per cinema during its opening weekend. The film went on to gross $7.7 million internationally.  Rotten Tomatoes describes it as "full of gore, but low on suspense".

Plot
Angela Bridges (Rachel Nichols) is a young and beautiful businesswoman who works in a Midtown Manhattan office block and gets stuck working late on Christmas Eve, before leaving to attend a family party. When she reaches the second underground parking level (P2) beneath the office block, she discovers that her car will not start. After receiving assistance from a security guard named Thomas Barclay (Wes Bentley) and turning down his offer to spend Christmas with him, she calls for a taxi and waits in the lobby. When the taxi arrives, she discovers she is locked in the lobby and runs back into the parking garage. The taxi leaves without her and the lights soon shut down. Angela, guided by the light on her cell phone, wanders around the deserted parking lot. Thomas, who is revealed to be psychopathic, drugs her with chloroform and takes her to his office.

Later, Angela awakens in a haze inside Thomas' office, having been changed into a white dress and high-heels by Thomas and her foot chained to the table. Thomas tells her that he loves her, despite her "many sins", having obsessively watched and recorded her for some time through the CCTV in the office block. Despite Angela's pleas and threats, Thomas continues to hold her against her will, even forcing her to call her family and lie about an illness so that no one will come looking for her. Angela tries to escape, but cannot due to Thomas' Rottweiler named Rocky, and is also confined to handcuffs by Thomas.

Taking Angela to another level of the parking lot, Thomas reveals her co-worker Jim Harper (Simon Reynolds) tied to an office chair. Thomas delusively believes Jim is a terrible person after he witnessed him drunkenly grope Angela at an office party, and refuses to listen to or believe Angela's pleas that Jim apologized for his drunken action earlier. Thomas instructs Angela to get back at Jim by hitting him with a flashlight, but ultimately beats Jim himself, and then sadistically rams him into the wall with his car multiple times, killing him. Amidst the murder, Angela is able to escape barefoot after ditching her high heels.

While Thomas hides the evidence, Angela finds a safe place to hide and manages to get her handcuffed hands in front of her. She rushes back to Thomas' office to retrieve her cell phone, finding key cards and a spot near the locked gate that has reception, but after dialing 911, she drops her phone on the other side of the gate. She uses a key card to get to the elevators, with Thomas right behind. While in the elevator, Angela calls for help from the panel of the elevator. She hears a voice that appears to be an operator but later turns out to be Thomas, who flushes her out by flooding the elevator with a fire hose from a higher floor. Amidst the flooding, the body of Karl Donson (Philip Akin), another security guard, drops down and hits her.

While hiding in the parking lot, Angela is tormented by Thomas, who plays Elvis Presley's "Blue Christmas" over the intercom. She breaks open an emergency fire axe and begins to destroy the cameras one by one while making her way to his office, prepared to fight. On entering, she finds a video playing of Thomas himself molesting her body while she was drugged, enraging Angela. Thomas sneaks up behind her, knocks her out with a taser, and hides her in the trunk of a car, just as two police officers (Philip Williams and Arnold Pinnock) arrive in response to a reported disturbance. Angela wakes up and breaks out, but realizes she is too late as she sees the police car drive off. Thomas releases Rocky, who chases Angela and bites her leg, although she manages to kill Rocky; this act causes Thomas to become enraged and continue pursuing Angela in a more vicious manner.

Angela finds keys in a car rental office and tries to escape by car, but is side-swiped by Thomas in another vehicle, leading to a game of chicken, which Angela wins. However, in the heat of the chase, she flips the vehicle. Thomas opens the door, and Angela, feigning unconsciousness, manages to stab him in the eye and choke him with her handcuffs, while denouncing Thomas for his sadistic actions. She takes his keys to free herself, cuffs him to the car just before he comes to, and begins to leave while taking his taser. Thomas, now powerless and trapped, desperately starts pleading with her, revealing he's always alone, but ultimately insults her in anger when Angela doesn't respond to his pleas. In retaliation, Angela points the taser at a stream of gasoline leaking from the car, and sarcastically wishes a now-horrified Thomas a merry Christmas before using the taser to ignite the gasoline, engulfing a screaming Thomas in the flames and causing the car to explode, killing him.

Finally free, Angela (who is now wet, bloody, and injured) opens the garage gate and limps out into a cold and desolate Manhattan Christmas morning just as the fire department, paramedics, and police can be heard arriving.

Cast

Production

Development
After completing the horror film High Tension (2003), director Alexandre Aja and his co-writer, Grégory Levasseur, began developing a new screenplay based on a series of real-life attacks on women in parking garages in Paris. Aja and Levasseur approached their friend, Franck Khalfoun, who had appeared in a small role in High Tension, to collaborate on the project, and ultimately, direct it. According to Aja, when asked about the comparisons with High Tension, he said: "With a strong plot in the vein of High Tension, P2 gives us a chance to further explore the survival aspect of the terror movie."

Filming
P2 began principal photography on August 14, 2006, and continued filming through late 2006. Filming took place exclusively at night, at a real, working Toronto parking garage. There were fourteen white dresses made for the character of Angela to wear; each one was in various stages of dirtiness and decay. Three different dogs were used to portray Thomas' Rottweiler. Both Aja and Levasseur worked as second unit directors on the film.

Commenting on the shoot, actress Rachel Nichols recalled: "This was definitely the most demanding job I ever had...  we shot for two months straight, working nights. I was in a dress with bare feet and they made these weird pads for the bottom of my feet. My arms are bare, my legs are bare, I’m wearing handcuffs for most of it – the handcuffs were real throughout, even when I’m driving the car. The bruises were unbelievable. As hostile and angry as I was...  I think it actually really ended up helping make the whole thing real for me."

Music
The film's original score was written and performed by American musical duo tomandandy. Khalfoun commented on his decision to hire them for the project: "A lot of their stuff was electronic, though, and I wanted something very classical. The parking lot in itself was so urban that putting an urban soundtrack over it was overkill. We needed something more Bernard Herrmann-esque, we wanted something in that vein."

Though an official soundtrack was not released, the following songs are featured in the film:
"Santa Baby" by Eartha Kitt
"Blue Christmas" by Elvis Presley
"Calm Down" by Mr. Complex
 "Living Funeral" by Dance Yourself to Death
"I'd Like You For Christmas" by Julie London

Additionally, it features renditions of the following traditional Christmas songs:
"Good King Wenceslas"
"Silent Night"
"Deck the Halls"

Release
P2 was intended to be featured in the UK-based London FrightFest Film Festival in August 2007, but was pulled out soon before its date and replaced with Teeth. The film was distributed in the United States by Summit Entertainment, and marked the company's first feature film distribution.

Box office
P2 was released theatrically in the United States on November 9, 2007, in 2,131 theaters. The film was a box-office bomb, averaging only $977 per theater from November 9–11, 2007, making it—at the time—one of worst opening weekends for a film released on over 2,000 screens. The film's theatrical run continued in the United States through December 2007, concluding with a domestic gross of $3,995,018. It earned an additional $3,771,222 in foreign markets, making for a worldwide gross of $7,766,240.

Critical reception

On review aggregator Rotten Tomatoes, P2 holds an approval rating of 35% based on 72 reviews, with an average rating of 5.7/10. The website's critics consensus states: "P2 is full of gore, but low on suspense, featuring a cat-and-mouse plot has been done many times before." On Metacritic, the film has an average score of 37 out of 100 based on 15 critics, indicating "generally unfavorable reviews".

Robert Abele of the Los Angeles Times felt the film's screenplay was redolent of other horror films, describing it as a "dull story" that "quickly devolves to little more than a strained effort in trapping, terrorizing...  and torture." Jeannette Catsoulis of The New York Times gave P2 a favorable review, though she likened it to an exploitation film, "bloody but not punishingly so, limiting the gore to tightly edited set pieces that never linger...  Throw in a car that won’t start, a creepy security guard and a filmmaking team with perfect synchronicity, and the result is a minimalist nightmare." Roger Ebert gave the film a favorable 3 out of 4 stars, and stated in his review that "although the plot may seem like a formulatic slasher film, P2 is in fact a very well made, atmospheric thriller with gritty yet realistic characters."

Home media
P2 was released on DVD in the United States by Summit Home Entertainment in March 2008. The same year, the film given a region 2 DVD and region B Blu-ray release in the United Kingdom.

See also
 List of films set around Christmas
 Holiday horror

Notes

References

External links
 
 
 
 
 

2000s Christmas horror films
2007 films
2007 horror films
2007 psychological thriller films
American horror thriller films
American psychological horror films
American chase films
American Christmas films
American Christmas horror films
Films about stalking
Films directed by Franck Khalfoun
Films set in Manhattan
Films shot in Toronto
Films scored by Tomandandy
Summit Entertainment films
2007 directorial debut films
2000s English-language films
2000s American films